7 Trianguli is a solitary star located in the northern constellation Triangulum. It has an apparent magnitude of 5.25, making it faintly visible to the naked eye under ideal conditions.

7 Trianguli has a stellar classification of A0 V or B9.5 V, depending on the study. At present it has 2.77 times the mass of the Sun and 3.24 times the radius of the Sun. It has been classified as having a peculiar spectrum, but it is considered doubtful that it is actually a chemically peculiar star.

Together with δ Trianguli and γ Trianguli, it forms an optical (line-of-sight) triple.

References

A-type main-sequence stars
B-type main-sequence stars
Triangulum (constellation)
Trianguli, 7
013869
010559
0655
Durchmusterung objects